KVVR (97.9 FM) is a radio station broadcasting in an adult contemporary format. Licensed to Dutton, Montana, United States, the station serves the Great Falls area. The station is currently owned by Townsquare Media and features programming from Compass Media Networks, United Stations Radio Networks, and Westwood One.

History
The station went on the air as KBJF on September 8, 1998. On December 3, 1998 the station changed its call sign to KLHK. On May 3, 2001 the station changed its call sign to the current KVVR.

References

External links

VVR
Radio stations established in 1998
Townsquare Media radio stations